Podmore is an English surname. Notable people with the surname include:

 Bill Podmore (1931–1994), English television producer
 Colin Podmore (born 1960), British historian and Anglican lay leader
 Edgar Podmore (1918–2000), English footballer
 Frank Podmore (1856–1910), English writer
 George Podmore (1924−2005), Australian jockey
 Harry Podmore (born 1994), English cricketer
 John Podmore, English politician

Fictional characters:
 Dave Podmore, fictional English cricketer
 Sturgis Podmore, fictional wizard

See also
Podmore case, English criminal case

English-language surnames